Yingcheng may refer to these places in China:
Yingcheng, a county-level city in Xiaogan, Hubei, China.
Yingcheng, Jingzhou, a town in Jingzhou District, Jingzhou, Hubei.
Yingcheng Subdistrict, Changchun, Jilin.
Yingcheng Subdistrict, Yingde, Guangdong.